Tim Johnston (11 March 1941 – 9 October 2021) was a British long-distance runner. He competed in the marathon at the 1968 Summer Olympics. In 1968, Johnston was the British national champion in the six mile event and the marathon. He also won the silver medal in the men's event at the 1967 International Cross Country Championships. During the 1960s, Johnston set a British and World record in distance running.

Biography
Johnston was born in Oxford, England in 1941. In the 1950s, he attended Bedales School in Hampshire, before going to Trinity College, Cambridge. At Bedales, Johnston became a two-time Hampshire Schools mile champion. While at Trinity College, he became a cross-country runner. In 1968, he was a two-time national champion, including setting a British record in the six mile event. Also during the 1960s, Johnston won two Inter-Counties crowns and three Southern titles.

At the 1968 Summer Olympics in Mexico City, Johnston competed in the men's marathon, where he finished in eighth place. Johnston also tried to compete at the 1972 Summer Olympics in Munich, but suffered from an Achilles tendon injury.

Outside of sport, Johnston was also a solicitor and worked at the European Economic Community as a lawyer-linguist. He later went to work at the International Court of Justice in The Hague as a legal translator.

In 2016, Johnston wrote a biography on Otto Peltzer, a German middle distance runner, which was illustrated by fellow Olympian Donald Macgregor.

References

External links
 

1941 births
2021 deaths
Athletes (track and field) at the 1968 Summer Olympics
British male long-distance runners
British male marathon runners
Olympic athletes of Great Britain
Sportspeople from Oxford